The 2004–05 Vijay Hazare Trophy was the third season of the Vijay Hazare Trophy, a List A cricket tournament in India. It was contested between 27 domestic cricket teams of India, starting in January and finishing in April 2005. The final was tied between Uttar Pradesh and Tamil Nadu, and they shared the Trophy.

References

External links
 Series home at ESPN Cricinfo

Vijay Hazare Trophy
Vijay Hazare Trophy